Ruchira Palliyaguruge (born 22 January 1968) is a Sri Lankan umpire and a former first-class cricketer. Ruchira played for Bloomfield Cricket and Athletic Club, Chilaw Marians Cricket Club, Saracens Sports Club, Nondescripts Cricket Club, Old Cambrian Sports Club. Palliyaguruge bowled right-arm medium pace and batted right-handed. Playing mostly club cricket, he has over 200 first-class wickets to his name and  also over 4000 runs in a career that began in 1989/90.

Ruchira Palliyaguruge's debut One Day International (ODI) umpiring was between Sri Lanka and Australia at Hambantota in 2011. Ruchira's umpiring career has been marked with controversy. According to an article in The Sunday Times: Senior cricket umpires have petitioned Sri Lanka Cricket that umpires such as Ruchira Palliyaguruge named for the ICC Panel have not been done according to merit. He made his Twenty20 debut on 17 August 2004, for Panadura Sports Club in the 2004 SLC Twenty20 Tournament.

He was selected as one of the twenty umpires to stand in matches during the 2015 Cricket World Cup. He stood in the final of the 2016 Asia Cup. In November 2016 he won Sri Lanka Cricket's award for International Umpire of the Year.
In 2018, in the  2nd Test Between Bangladesh and West Indies in Dhaka Palliyaguruge stood his first match as a Test umpire.

In April 2019, he was named as one of the sixteen umpires to stand in matches during the 2019 Cricket World Cup. In February 2022, he was named as one of the on-field umpires for the 2022 Women's Cricket World Cup in New Zealand.

See also
 List of Test cricket umpires
 List of One Day International cricket umpires
 List of Twenty20 International cricket umpires

References

External links
 

1968 births
Living people
Bloomfield Cricket and Athletic Club cricketers
Sri Lankan cricketers
Chilaw Marians Cricket Club cricketers
Nondescripts Cricket Club cricketers
Ruhuna cricketers
Sri Lankan Test cricket umpires
Sri Lankan One Day International cricket umpires
Sri Lankan Twenty20 International cricket umpires